The 2021 Thailand Champions Cup was the 5th Thailand Champions Cup, an annual football match contested by the winners of the previous season's Thai League 1 and Thai FA Cup competitions. It was sponsored by Daikin, and known as the Daikin Thailand Champions Cup for sponsorship purposes. The match was played on 1 September 2021 at the 700th Anniversary of Chiangmai Stadium in Mae Rim, Chiangmai and contested by 2020–21 Thai League 1 champions BG Pathum United, and Chiangrai United as the champions of the 2020–21 Thai FA Cup. It has live broadcast on Channel 5 HD and AIS Play.

Qualified teams

Match

Details

Assistant referees:
 Rachen Srichai
 Worapong Prasertsri
Fourth official:
 Natee Chusuwan
Assistant VAR:
 Torpong Somsing
 Rachan Dawangpa
Match Commissioner:
 Khajorn Treesophanakorn
Referee Assessor:
 Preecha Kangram
General Coordinator:
 Narubet Kietprasert

Winner

See also
 2021–22 Thai League 1
 2021–22 Thai League 2
 2021–22 Thai League 3
 2021–22 Thai League 3 Northern Region
 2021–22 Thai League 3 Northeastern Region
 2021–22 Thai League 3 Eastern Region
 2021–22 Thai League 3 Western Region
 2021–22 Thai League 3 Southern Region
 2021–22 Thai League 3 Bangkok Metropolitan Region
 2021–22 Thai League 3 National Championship
 2021–22 Thai FA Cup
 2021–22 Thai League Cup

References

2021 in Thai football cups
Thailand Champions Cup
2021